Lord of Men (born 1993) is a thoroughbred racehorse. He won the Prix de la Salamandre in 1995.

External links
 

1993 racehorse births
Racehorses bred in the United Kingdom
Racehorses trained in the United Kingdom
Thoroughbred family B3